Blackpool Sands may refer to:

Blackpool Sands, Blackpool, Lancashire, England
Blackpool Sands, Dartmouth, Devon, England